Imam Ali Expressway is an expressway in eastern Tehran. It is from Daraba to Ray. This highway links the northernmost point of Tehran to the southernmost site, it cuts off east-west highways and streets, and this makes it easier to access other parts of Tehran. Imam Ali highway plays a role as a communication link among many main arteries of the city.

References 

Expressways in Tehran
Odonyms referring to religion